This table provides a list of nationwide public opinion polls that have been conducted in the run-up to the 2019 Argentine general election, scheduled to take place on 27 October 2019, with a second round to take place on 24 November 2019, should no candidate obtain the necessary number of votes in the first round.

Polls conducted since the submission of candidacies
The following opinion polls were conducted after the deadline for the submission of candidacies before the National Electoral Chamber, on 22 June 2019.

Primaries

Polls conducted before the submission of candidacies
The following opinion polls were conducted before the deadline for the submission of candidacies before the National Electoral Chamber, on 22 June 2019.

First round

Second round

References

Opinion polling in Argentina